Sir Thiruvarur Muthuswamy Iyer  (28 January 183225 January 1895) was an Indian lawyer who, in 1877, became the first native Indian during the British Raj to be appointed as judge of the Madras High Court. He also acted as the Chief Justice of the Madras High Court in 1893. He is also one of the first Indians to have a statue.

On completion of his schooling, Iyer served in subordinate posts in the civil service even while continuing his education. Iyer graduated in law from the Presidency College, Madras while serving as the magistrate of police and served as a judge in mofussil centres from 1871 to 1877, when he was appointed to the bench of the High Court of Madras. Iyer served as a judge of the Madras High Court from 1877 till his death in 1895, even acting as the Chief Justice for three months in 1893.

Iyer was acclaimed for his sharp intellect, memory and legal expertise. He advocated social reform and campaigned in support of women's education, widow remarriage and the legal recognition of sambandham. . In 1893, Iyer was made a Knight Commander of the Indian Empire in recognition of his services.

Early life 

Iyer was born in a poor Brahmin family in Vuchuwadi, Madras Presidency, British Raj on 28 January 1832. Iyer's father, Venkata Narayana Sastri, died when Muthuswamy was young and he moved with his mother to Thiruvarur to make a living. At Thiruvarur, Iyer found employment as village accountant.  However, his mother died soon afterward leaving Iyer with little support. At this time, he was known to have read under the street lamp at nights, while working in early morning and evening. Around this time, Iyer's talents were recognised by the tahsildar Muthuswamy Naicker who arranged for the former to study at Sir Henry Montgomery's school in Madras as a companion to his young nephew, and there he won prizes and scholarships year after year.

Legal career 

About this time, the Madras government instituted an examination for pleaders known as "Pleader's Test". In the examination held at Kumbakonam in February 1856, only three succeeded, Iyer and R. Raghunatha Rao emerging first and second. On successfully passing the Pleader's Test, Iyer was appointed District Munsiff of Tranquebar. On 2 July 1859, Iyer was appointed Deputy Collector of Tanjore. On 9 July 1865, Ier was appointed Sub-Judge of South Canara and served till July 1868, when he was appointed District Magistrate of police at Madras.

While serving as the magistrate of police, Iyer obtained his law degree law from the Presidency College, Madras. He also held a degree in Sanskrit at that time.

Iyer commenced his legal career immediately after graduation. He was appointed a judge of the Court of Small Causes in 1871. The very next year, he was made Fellow of Madras University. In 1877, the Madras Government took the controversial decision to appoint him as the first Indian judge of the High Court of Madras.

Appointment to the bench of Madras High Court and controversy 

In 1877, Iyer was appointed to the bench of the High Court of Madras. He was the first Indian to be appointed to this prestigious post. However, Muthuswamy's appointment was vehemently condemned by a Madras newspaper called The Native Public Opinion. This prompted a strong reaction from Indian nationalists who founded The Hindu newspaper to voice public opinion against the outrage.

Later career 

Muthuswami Iyer served as a judge of the Madras High Court from 1877 to 1895. He acted for three months in 1893 as the Chief Justice of the Madras High Court, the first Indian to do so.

Reforms 

During his early career, Iyer also served as the President of the Malabar Marriage Commission. During his tenure as President of the Commission, he campaigned for the legal recognition of Sambandham and other forms of marriage practised in the Malabar. In 1872, Iyer established the Widow Remarriage Association in Madras and advocated remarriage of Brahmin widows.

In 1872, he was nominated fellow of the Madras University. He became a syndic in 1877. He was also invited to attend the Coronation Durbar at Delhi in 1877.

Honours 

In 1878, Muthuswami Iyer was created a Companion of the Most Eminent Order of the Indian Empire. In 1893, he was knighted for his services to the Crown.

Death 

Muthuswami Iyer died in January 1895 after an illness of ten days. On his death, Sir S. Subramania Iyer took the seat in the bench of the Madras High Court left vacant by his death.

A statue of Muthuswami Iyer was erected in the precincts of the Madras High Court campus. The section of Kamrajar Salai connecting Chepauk with the Madras High Court is known as T. Muthuswamy Salai.

Notes

References 

Attribution:

Further reading 
 
 

1832 births
1895 deaths
Knights Commander of the Order of the Indian Empire
Indian knights
Presidency College, Chennai alumni
19th-century Indian lawyers
People from Tiruvarur district
Chief Justices of the Madras High Court
20th-century Indian judges